Kevin Cummins may refer to:

 Kevin Cummins (hurler) (born 1946), retired Irish hurler from County Cork
 Kevin Cummins (photographer) (born 1953), British photographer